Gentles is a Scottish surname. Notable people with the surname include:

 James Clark Gentles (1921–1997), Scottish mycologist
 Ryan Gentles (born 1977), American music manager
 Ryan Gentles (21st century), American actor

Surnames of Scottish origin